COMIT was the first string processing language (compare SNOBOL, TRAC, and Perl), developed on the IBM 700/7000 series computers by Dr. Victor Yngve, University of Chicago, and collaborators at MIT from 1957 to 1965.  Yngve created the language for supporting computerized research in the field of linguistics, and more specifically, the area of machine translation for natural language processing. The creation of COMIT led to the creation of SNOBOL.

Bob Fabry, University of Chicago, was responsible for COMIT II on Compatible Time Sharing System.

References

Sammet, J.E. "String and list processing languages", in Programming Languages:  History and Fundamentals. . Prentice-Hall. 1969.

Text-oriented programming languages
Pattern matching programming languages
Programming languages created in 1957